Frenesí (Spanish for "Frenzy") is a 1992 Grammy Award-winning album by American singer Linda Ronstadt.

Release
Frenesí was released on September 15, 1992.  It was Ronstadt's third Spanish-language album. After many years out of print, this album was reissued, along with Ronstadt's two Mariachi discs, in 2016.

Reception

Frenesí reached #193 on the Billboard album chart, #3 on the Top Latin Albums chart, and #17 on the Tropic/Salsa chart. Three singles charted on the Hot Latin Tracks chart: "Frenesi" at #5, "Perfidia" at #7, and "Entre Abismos" at #33.

At the 35th Grammy Awards in 1993, Frenesí won the Grammy Award for Best Tropical Latin Album.

Despite the acclaim for this album, in the 21st century Roch Parisien rated the album poorly in his Allmusic review, writing: "...there's little that sounds street level or rootsy about these sessions. I can't help picturing a wind-up lounge band holding court at some tourist-trap Holiday Inn in Acapulco."

Track listing

Personnel

Linda Ronstadt – vocals
Tito Allen – background vocals
Juan Jose Almaguer – vocals
Jesús Guzmán – vocals
Adalberto Santiago – vocals
Bob Mann – guitar
Oscar Meza – bass
Gilberto Puente – guitar
Joe Rotondi – piano
Guillermo Edghill – bass
Luis Conte – percussion
Walfredo de los Reyes, Sr. – percussion
Armando Peraza – percussion
Pancho Roman – percussion
Orestes Vilató – percussion
Justo Almario – horn
Gene Burkert – horn
Dennis Farias – horn
Ramon Flores – horn
Daniel Fornero – horn
Mike Turre – horn
Arturo Velasco – horn
Harry Kim – horn
José Román – horn
Joel Peskin – horn
Debra Henry – strings
James Hurley – strings
Roxanna Jacobson – strings
David Kadarauch – strings
Clifton Foster – strings
Ruth Freeman – strings
Stuart Canin – strings
Jeremy Cohen – strings
Adrienne Duckworth – strings
Jim Dukey – strings
Joseph Edelberg – strings
Ronald Erickson – strings
Jenny Amador – strings
Jeff Beal – strings
William Klingelhofer – strings
Bill Klingelhoffer – strings
Katie McElrath – strings
Sharon O'Connor – strings
Irene Sazer – strings
Rebecca Sebring – strings
James Shallenberger – strings
Greg Sudmeir – strings
Mark Summer – strings
John Tenney – strings
Martha Henninger Rubin – strings
Nathan Rubin – strings
Virginia Price-Kvistad – strings
Production notes:
Peter Asher – producer, engineer
George Massenburg – producer, mixing, engineer
Ray Santos – arranger
David Gleeson – engineer
Craig Silvey – engineer
Brett Swain – engineer
Nathaniel Kunkel – engineer
Robert Blakeman – photography
Kosh Art Direction – design

References 

1992 albums
Elektra Records albums
Linda Ronstadt albums
Albums produced by George Massenburg
Grammy Award for Best Tropical Latin Album